Ovalipidae is a family of sand crabs in the order Decapoda. There are at least 3 genera and more than 20 described species in Ovalipidae. These were formerly members of the family Portunidae

Genera
These three genera belong to the family Ovalipidae:
 Echinolatus Davie & Crosnier, 2006
 Nectocarcinus A.Milne-Edwards, 1860
 Ovalipes Rathbun, 1898

References

Further reading

 
 
 

Decapods
Decapod families